Iryna Merkushina-Korchakina (born 3 August 1968 in Samara, Russia) is a biathlete who competed for Ukraine at the 1998 Winter Olympics, finishing 49th in the Women's sprint.

References

External links

Biathletes at the 1998 Winter Olympics
Olympic biathletes of Ukraine
1968 births
Ukrainian female biathletes
Living people
Sportspeople from Samara, Russia